Kim Min-kyum (Hangul: 김민겸; born July 4, 1995), better known by his stage name Leellamarz (Hangul: 릴러말즈), is a South Korean rapper and singer. He was a contestant on Show Me the Money 5. He released his debut album Y on July 7, 2017. In June 2019 he joined Dok2 and The Quiett's sub-label, Ambition Musik.

Discography

Studio albums

Single albums

Extended plays

Singles

Filmography

Television show

References

External links

1995 births
Living people
South Korean male rappers
South Korean hip hop singers
21st-century South Korean  male singers